Sergei Bernatsky (born March 1, 1982) is a Russian professional ice hockey defenceman. He is currently an unrestricted free agent. He most recently played with HC Sochi of the Kontinental Hockey League (KHL).

Playing career
Bernatsky began his professional career in 2000 as a part of the now defunct Superleague with HC CSKA Moscow, having played before a few seasons for the farm club of his native hometown with Chemist.

Before the 2007–08 season, Bernatsky moved to HC Neftekhimik Nizhnekamsk. Bernatsky made his Kontinental Hockey League debut playing with HC Neftekhimik Nizhnekamsk during the inaugural 2008–09 KHL season. He played in Nizhnekamsk until 2011 earning a reputation for playing a physical and tough game. Upon leaving the club he held the record in the number of penalty minutes in the national championship.

On May 8, 2011, Sergei signed a two-year contract with Metallurg Magnitogorsk. On May 1 2013, Sergei has signed a contract with Torpedo Nizhny Novgorod.

References

External links

1982 births
Living people
Metallurg Magnitogorsk players
HC Neftekhimik Nizhnekamsk players
Russian ice hockey defencemen
HC Sochi players
Torpedo Nizhny Novgorod players
People from Voskresensk
Sportspeople from Moscow Oblast